The 1988–89 Southwest Missouri State Bears basketball team represented Southwest Missouri State University in National Collegiate Athletic Association (NCAA) Division I men's basketball during the 1988–89 season. Playing in the Summit League (AMCU-8) and led by head coach Charlie Spoonhour, the Bears finished the season with a 21–10 overall record and won the AMCU-8 regular season and conference tournament titles. Southwest Missouri State lost to Seton Hall in the opening round of the NCAA tournament.

Roster

Schedule and results

|-
!colspan=9| Regular season

|-
!colspan=9| 1989 AMCU-8 men's basketball tournament

|-
!colspan=10| 1989 NCAA Division I men's basketball tournament

References

Missouri State Bears basketball seasons
Southwest Missouri State
Missouri State Bears Basketball Team
Missouri State Bears Basketball Team
Southwest Missouri State